Milena Vukotic (born 23 April 1935) is an Italian former ballerina and a stage, television, and film actress.

Biography
Vukotic was born in Rome, to a Serb  Montenegrin comedy playwright father and an Italian pianist/composer mother. As a child she studied acting and classical dance, in Italy and France.

A brilliant character actress, Vukotic became well known for her role of Pina Fantozzi in the Fantozzi series of comedy films (winning a Nastro d'Argento for Best Supporting Actress for her role in Fantozzi in paradiso) and, later in her life, for the role of Grandma Enrica in the TV series Un medico in famiglia. She worked with Federico Fellini, Luis Buñuel and Andrei Tarkovsky.

On stage, she became one of Rina Morelli's favourite actresses and worked in other prestigious theatrical productions with directors like Franco Zeffirelli, Giorgio Strehler, Paolo Poli and Jean Cocteau.

She had a recurring role on the French television series Une famille formidable. In 1987 she played in the German series Anna, which was a big success in the German-speaking countries.

Selected filmography

The Centurion (1961)
The Thursday (1963)
Juliet of the Spirits (1965)
Thrilling (1965)
Made in Italy (1965)
Questa volta parliamo di uomini (1965)
The Devil in Love (1966)
Rita the Mosquito (1966)
Me, Me, Me... and the Others (1966)
Arabella (1967)
The Taming of the Shrew (1967)
The Biggest Bundle of Them All (1968)
Love and Anger (1969)
The Adventurers (1970)
Come Have Coffee with Us (1970)
The Discreet Charm of the Bourgeoisie (1972)
Blood for Dracula (1974)
The Phantom of Liberty (1974)
My Friends (1975)
That Obscure Object of Desire (1977)
Black Journal (1977)  
Saturday, Sunday and Friday (1979)
La terrazza (1980)
Sunday Lovers (1980)
Fantozzi contro tutti (1980)
Il turno (1981)
Bianco, rosso e Verdone (1981)
All My Friends Part 2 (1982)
Monsignor (1982)
Nostalghia (1983)
Fantozzi subisce ancora (1983)
The House of the Yellow Carpet (1983)
Occhio, malocchio, prezzemolo e finocchio (1983)
Max, Mon Amour (1986)
Fantozzi va in pensione (1988)
Mano rubata (1989)
Fantozzi alla riscossa (1990)
The Wicked (1991)
Stefano Quantestorie (1993)
Fantozzi in paradiso (1993)
Fantozzi – Il ritorno (1996)
Fantozzi 2000 – La clonazione (1999)
A Good Woman (2004)
Saturn in Opposition (2007)
Un giorno perfetto (2008)
Letters to Juliet (2010)
The Chair of Happiness (2014)
La macchinazione (2016)
Natale da chef (2017)
In vacanza su Marte (2020)

Awards and nominations

David di Donatello
1983 nominated to David di Donatello for Best Supporting Actress for her performance in All My Friends Part 2
1991 nominated to David di Donatello for Best Supporting Actress for her performance in Fantozzi alla riscossa
2014 nominated to David di Donatello for Best Supporting Actress for her performance in The Chair of Happiness

Nastro d'Argento
1976 nominated to Nastro d'Argento Best supporting Actress for her performance in My Friends
1991 nominated to Nastro d'Argento Best supporting Actress for her performance in Fantozzi alla riscossa
1994 Nastro d'Argento Best supporting Actress for her performance in Fantozzi in paradiso
2016 nominated to Nastro d'Argento Best supporting Actress for her performance in La macchinazione

External links

Official website 

1935 births
Living people
Dancers from Rome
Italian film actresses
Italian people of Montenegrin descent
Actresses from Rome
Nastro d'Argento winners
Ciak d'oro winners